In the Year of the Pig is an American documentary film directed by Emile de Antonio about American involvement in the Vietnam War. It was released in 1968 while the U.S. was in the middle of its military engagement, and was politically controversial. One year later, the film was nominated for the Academy Award for Best Documentary Feature. In 1990, Jonathan Rosenbaum characterized the film as "the first and best of the major documentaries about Vietnam".

Summary
The film, which is in black and white, contains much historical footage and many interviews. Those interviewed include Harry Ashmore, Daniel Berrigan, Philippe Devillers, David Halberstam, Roger Hilsman, Jean Lacouture, Kenneth P. Landon, Thruston B. Morton, Paul Mus, Charlton Osburn, Harrison Salisbury, Ilya Todd, John Toller, David K. Tuck, David Wurfel and John White.

Produced during the Vietnam War, the film was greeted with hostility by many audiences, with bomb threats and vandalism directed at theaters that showed it. When confronted with the charge that In the Year of the Pig had a leftist perspective, de Antonio conceded the point, replying: “Only God is objective, and he doesn’t make films.”

Home media
In the Year of the Pig was released as a region 1 DVD in 2005. In addition to the film, the DVD has audio commentary with director Emile de Antonio composed from archival sources, an interview with de Antonio, and liner notes by de Antonio scholar Douglas Kellner.

Influences
A still photograph used in the film that displayed Marine Corporal Michael Wynn later was incorporated into the album cover for The Smiths' second album Meat Is Murder (1985). The insignia on Wynn's helmet was changed to "meat is murder".

See also
Hearts and Minds, the Oscar-winning 1974 documentary film by Peter Davis
 Modernist film

Footnotes

References
Schwartzman, Theresa. 2004. In the Year of the Pig, 1968. UCLA Film and Television Archive: 12th Festival of Preservation, July 22-August 21, 2004. Festival guest publication.

External links

In the Year of the Pig review by Jim Frosch (March 7, 1969) at The Harvard Crimson website
In the Year of the Pig at TCM.com (archived by the Wayback Machine)

1969 films
American documentary films
Documentary films about the Vietnam War
Opposition to United States involvement in the Vietnam War
Films directed by Emile de Antonio
1969 documentary films
1960s English-language films
1960s American films
Collage film